Franz Conrad (22 March 1913 – 1942) was a Luxembourgian weightlifter. He competed in the men's featherweight event at the 1936 Summer Olympics.

References

1913 births
1942 deaths
Luxembourgian male weightlifters
Olympic weightlifters of Luxembourg
Weightlifters at the 1936 Summer Olympics
People from Schifflange